Shri Manshapurna Karni Mata Temple is a Hindu temple located on the Machla Magra Hills, near the Doodh Talai Lake in Udaipur, Rajasthan. It enshrines the stone idol of Karni Mata. There are views from the temple of the city and its lakes. The walkway is for pedestrians only, as no vehicles can enter in the hill boundary.

Access
The Karni Mata Temple is located near the center of the Udaipur City. It is around 24 km away from Udaipur Airport, and just 4 km from Udaipur City railway station and Udaipur City Bus Depot. Visitors can also take local Tongas, auto-rickshaws and taxis to reach Doodh Talai.
Karni Mata Temple can be reached via ropeway.

See also
 Udaipur
 Tourist Attractions in Udaipur
 Doodh Talai Lake
 City Palace, Udaipur

References

External links
 Web Design by Yug Technology Official website

Tourist attractions in Udaipur
Hindu temples in Udaipur

Charan